Albert T. Sanders III (January 1, 1950 – May 4, 1994) was an American basketball player who played briefly in the original American Basketball Association (ABA).

Born and raised in Baton Rouge, Louisiana, Sanders played college basketball at Louisiana State and played for Virginia Squires of the ABA.  He appeared in 4 games during the 1972–73 season, averaging 2.0 Points per game.

References

1950 births
1994 deaths
American men's basketball players
Baltimore Bullets (1963–1973) draft picks
Basketball players from Baton Rouge, Louisiana
LSU Tigers basketball players
Power forwards (basketball)
Virginia Squires players